Centralia is a city in Clinton, Jefferson, Marion, and Washington counties in the U.S. state of Illinois with the largest portion in Marion County. The city is the largest in three of the counties; Clinton, Marion, and Washington, but is not a county seat of any of them. The population was 12,182 as of the 2020 census, down from 13,032 in 2010.

History
Centralia is named for the Illinois Central Railroad, built in 1853. The city was founded at the location where the two original branches of the railroad converged. Centralia was first chartered as a city in 1859. Now Canadian National owns the line.

In the southern city limits is the intersection of the Third Principal Meridian and its baseline. This initial point was established in 1815, and it governs land surveys for about 60% of the state of Illinois, including Chicago. The original monument is at the junction of Highway 51 and the Marion-Jefferson County Line Road; today there is a small easement situated in the northeast corner of this intersection, which contains a monument and historic marker.

Production of the PayDay candy bar began here in 1938. Michael Moore's documentary, The Big One (1998), opens with the closing of this candy bar plant in the late 20th century. It addresses similar economic woes in other cities.

The town of Centerville, Washington was renamed as Centralia, Washington to avoid being confused with another Centerville in that state.  The suggestion came from a former resident of the Illinois town.

Centralia’s city flag was designed in 1924 by Wendell Bauer, whose design was awarded first prize in a community-wide design competition. A broad red stripe through the center of the flag represents the railroads to which the city owes its existence. A gold star above and below the stripe signify the area’s mining and agricultural industries, respectively. Lastly, a triangle pyramid with a sphinx head design is symbolic of Egypt, a tribute to Southern Illinois’ nickname, “Little Egypt”.

The Centralia mine disaster occurred in 1947, when the nearby Centralia No. 5 coal mine exploded, killing 111 people. The was memorialized in folk singer Woody Guthrie's song "The Dying Miner".

Geography
Most of the city, including its downtown, is in southwestern Marion County, but the city extends west into Clinton County and south  into Washington and Jefferson counties. Centralia is one of three Illinois cities with portions in four counties, the others being Barrington Hills and Aurora. Because of its unique location within multiple counties, portions of Centralia are associated with different Core Based Statistical Areas (CBSAs). The Centralia Micropolitan Statistical Area includes all of Marion County. The Clinton County portion of the city is considered part of the St. Louis, MO–IL Metropolitan Statistical Area, while the Jefferson County portion lies within the Mt. Vernon Micropolitan Statistical Area. The portion of Centralia in Washington County is not considered part of any metropolitan or micropolitan area.

Demographics

As of the 2020 census there were 12,182 people, 5,458 households, and 2,776 families residing in the city. The racial makeup of the city was 77.92% White, 11.01% African American, 0.24% Native American, 2.09% Asian, 0.01% Pacific Islander, 1.33% from other races, and 7.41% from two or more races. Hispanic or Latino of any race were 3.29% of the population.

There were 5,458 households, out of which 44.89% had children under the age of 18 living with them, 35.36% were married couples living together, 12.59% had a female householder with no husband present, and 49.14% were non-families. 40.67% of all households were made up of individuals, and 19.59% had someone living alone who was 65 years of age or older. The average household size was 2.92 and the average family size was 2.20.

The city's age distribution consisted of 24.1% under the age of 18, 7.5% from 18 to 24, 23.8% from 25 to 44, 22.8% from 45 to 64, and 21.9% who were 65 years of age or older. The median age was 40.8 years. For every 100 females, there were 92.4 males. For every 100 females age 18 and over, there were 89.5 males.

The median income for a household in the city was $39,117, and the median income for a family was $60,754. Males had a median income of $38,632 versus $25,986 for females. The per capita income for the city was $25,141. About 15.7% of families and 23.1% of the population were below the poverty line, including 36.9% of those under age 18 and 10.0% of those age 65 or over.

Arts and culture

Centralia Cultural Society
The Centralia Cultural Society is a community arts center. The center hosts the Centralia Philharmonic Orchestra (an amateur orchestra), the Little Theatre Players, the Choral Society, Bronze Expressions Handbell Ensemble; and periodically hosts galleries by the Light and Lens photography club, and Palette and Brush club, and student art shows. The Little Theatre Players was established in 1961, and performs plays and musicals.

Local features

Foundation Park is the site of the annual Balloon Fest. Recent events have had about forty balloons and drew 40,000 visitors. The Annual Centralia Balloon festival was the event in which the second "Space Shuttle" hot air balloon crashed and burned due to a fuel line defect.

Foundation Park also hosts the Fantasy of Lights drive-through holiday light display during the months of November and December.

In addition to Foundation Park, the Centralia Foundation also supports the Centralia Carillon. Completed in 1983, with 65 bells, the carillon is ranked as the eighth-largest in the world. The largest bell, Great Tom, weighs  tons. The current carillonneur is Roy Kroezen.

One of only two remaining 2500-class steam locomotives from the Illinois Central Railroad is preserved on static display at Centralia's Fairview Park. The locomotive is maintained by the Age of Steam Memorial non-profit organization. A 9415 caboose and a rare Republic F-105 Thunderchief aircraft are also on display in the park.

Historic downtown

Centralia's downtown features historic architecture, and has seen recent development with the addition of a Splash Pad near the Centralia Carillon.

Commercial Historic District
In 2012, the downtown area of Centralia was added to the National Register of Historic Places. Notable historic buildings include the former Langenfield Hotel, Centralia House restaurant, Old National Bank buildings, Sadler Opera House, Centralia Sentinel Building, and the Illinois Theater.

The Langenfield Hotel was "established in 1912 by John Langenfield" and "became the premier hotel in the area." Images of the Langenfield Hotel have been used for postcards featuring Centralia. The name Langenfield was also connected to the historic Langenfield Motor Company buildings.

The Centralia Sentinel Building houses the Centralia Morning Sentinel newspaper and features Egyptian Revival style architecture. This may be connected to Southern Illinois' nickname of "Egypt," or "Little Egypt."

The Illinois Theater in downtown Centralia used to be a vaudeville and movie theater and is currently undergoing renovations that will enable it to seat 500 and hold professional entertainment performances.

The Centralia Area Historical Museum 
The Centralia Area Historical Museum is free to the public and contains three stories of photographs and artifacts from Centralia's extensive history as a major railway hub and mining town. The museum accepts items either as donations or through loans. In addition to the displays, the museum also contains the George Ross Library which holds city history books, newspapers and periodicals, as well as family histories and genealogies.

Parks and recreation 
Centralia's Foundation Park is a scenic  park that features hiking trails, an exercise trail, an ice skating pond and two fishing ponds stocked with bass, bluegill, and catfish. The park also sports a restored prairie, a 36-hole disc-golf course, a Chapel in the Woods, the Hall Shelter, the Sentinel Shelter, The Bowl (an outdoor amphitheater), Moose Oven, and the Miner's Memorial.

Fairview Park includes baseball and softball fields, tennis and sand volleyball courts, a skate park, a swimming pool complex, playgrounds, and picnic shelters.

The Centralia Recreational Complex is a 60,000 square foot recreational facility equipped with walking track, indoor basketball courts, competition and leisure swimming pools, weight rooms, and exercise classrooms.

The Centralia Community Youth Center provides after-school tutoring services, sports clubs including wrestling, chess, dance, Double Dutch jump roping, basketball, and karate. Their mission is “to help our community's youth from falling into the traps of today's society: crime, drugs, and gang activity. We do this through positive reinforcement and programs in the most grassroots style of community activism.” They also hosts concerts, camps, and community dinners.

Two lakes near Centralia offer water sport and fishing recreation. Raccoon Lake is a 970-acre man-made lake. It was built in 1942 and is a water reservoir. Boating and fishing are permitted on Raccoon Lake, with the appropriate licenses and permits. The lake hosts the annual Outboard Power Boat Races (as sponsored by the National Boat Racing Association and Outboard Drivers Association).

Lake Centralia is a 412-acre man-made lake, constructed in 1910, and is both a water reservoir and location for water sport activities such as boating and fishing. It has an average depth of 10 feet. It is located slightly northeast of Centralia. Largemouth bass, bluegill, crappie, and channel catfish populate the lake. Fishing licenses and boating permits are required. Fishermen are limited to two pole and line fishing. Largemouth bass fishing tournaments are held on Centralia Lake, with 28 tournaments being held in 2018.

Education
Public elementary schools in Centralia include Jordan Elementary (PK-1st grade) Schiller Elementary (2nd-3rd grade), and Centralia Junior High School (4th-8th grade). According to the 2018-2019 Illinois Report Card for school districts, Jordan Elementary scored as a Lowest Performing school, Schiller Elementary as a Commendable school, and Centralia Jr. High as an Underperforming school.

Private elementary schools in Centralia include Trinity Lutheran School (K-8), affiliated with Trinity Lutheran Church, St. Mary School (Preschool and K-8), affiliated with St. Mary Catholic Church, and New Horizon Christian School (Preschool and K-8), affiliated with Greenview Christian Church.

Centralia's public high school is Centralia High School. Its sports teams are called the Orphans and Annies. The Centralia boys basketball team won its 2,000th game during the 2007–08 season, becoming the first high school basketball team in the nation to achieve that milestone. The Centralia Orphans were the State Runner-Up in the 2011 Class 3A.

The Orphans got their unique nickname during the early 1900s when the boys' basketball team made it to the state tournament. The school was low on funds at the time, and the team was forced to pick its uniforms from a pile of non-matching red uniforms. At the state tournament, an announcer commented that the team looked like a bunch of orphans on the court because of their mismatched uniforms. The name stuck. Previously, the team had gone by nicknames such as the Reds and Cardinals. In 2013 and 2014, the Centralia Orphans were recently named the Most Unique Mascot in the nation by USA Today.

The private Christ Our Rock Lutheran High School first opened its doors in August 2004 with nine students. As of 2013, the student body has grown to over 100 students. Christ Our Rock is the home of the Silver Stallions.

Post-secondary education is available at Kaskaskia College, a community college serving the Centralia region. Kaskaskia College has extension centers in the surrounding towns of Vandalia, Salem, Greenville, Trenton, and Nashville. The Harry L.Crisp Technology Center in located on the east side of Centralia and houses occupational and technical programs. Kaskaskia College and its education centers also offer non-degree community education courses on subjects such as photography, gardening, and beekeeping.

Kaskaskia College is also the site of the Jim Beasley Veteran's Tribute, honoring veterans connected to the Kaskaskia College District 501.

The Airgo International Flight School is a Professional Flight Training school located at the Centralia Municipal Airport.

Infrastructure

Transportation
IL 161 runs east and west directly through Centralia and US Highway 51 runs north and south through the city.

South Central Transit is the public transportation system for Centralia and surrounding areas.

The City of Centralia owns and operates the Centralia Municipal Airport, a general aviation facility that can accommodate corporate and private aircraft. The runway is 5001 feet long. Airgo, Inc. is the fixed-base operator at the Centralia Municipal Airport.

Rail transportation

Amtrak, the national passenger rail system, provides service to Centralia. Amtrak Train 59, the southbound City of New Orleans, departs Centralia at 12:25 am daily with service to Carbondale, Fulton, Newbern-Dyersburg, Memphis, Greenwood, Yazoo City, Jackson, Hazlehurst, Brookhaven, McComb, Hammond and New Orleans. Amtrak Train 58, the northbound City of New Orleans, departs Centralia at 4:10 am daily with service to Effingham, Mattoon, Champaign-Urbana, Kankakee, Homewood and Chicago. Centralia is also served by Amtrak Train 390/391, the Saluki, daily in the morning, and Amtrak Train 392/393, the Illini, daily in the afternoon/evening. Both the Saluki and the Illini operate between Chicago and Carbondale.

Correctional center
The Centralia Correctional Center is a medium security prison for adult males opened in 1980. With an operating capacity of 1,572, its population in 2019 was 1,281.

Notable people

 Chad Beguelin, playwright and four-time Tony Award nominee
 Warren Billhartz, state legislator, businessman, and lawyer
 David Blackwell, statistician and first black member of National Academy of Sciences
 James Brady, press secretary to President Ronald Reagan
 Gilbert Bundy (1911–1955), cartoonist and illustrator, born Centralia
 Roland Burris, Illinois Attorney General, comptroller, United States senator
 Brian Dinkelman, second baseman with the Minnesota Twins
 Dike Eddleman, small forward with the Tri-Cities Blackhakws/Milwaukee Hawks and Fort Wayne Pistons
 Bryan Eversgerd, pitcher with St. Louis Cardinals and coach
 Dwight Friedrich, state legislator and businessman
 Gary Gaetti, third baseman with the 1987 World Series champion Minnesota Twins and five other MLB teams
 Dick Garrett, guard with Southern Illinois and NBA's Los Angeles Lakers, Buffalo Braves, New York Knicks, and Milwaukee Bucks
 Adruitha Lee, Academy Award winning hairstylist for their work in the film Dallas Buyers Club
 Mary Lee, actress
 Jean Madeira, opera singer
 Bobby Joe Mason, basketball player, Bradley University and Harlem Globetrotters
 Ken "Preacher" McBride, Harlem Globetrotter
 Florence McClure, Nevada activist
 Ora A. Oldfield, Illinois state senator and businessman
 Gene Paulette, infielder for four Major League Baseball teams; born in Centralia
 Smiley Quick, golfer with the PGA Tour
 Charles W. Root, Minnesota state legislator and lawyer
 Kirk Rueter, pitcher for the San Francisco Giants
 Nancy Scranton, golfer with the LPGA Tour
 June C. Smith, Chief Justice of the Illinois Supreme Court
 Tom Wargo, golfer with the Senior PGA Tour
 Dottie Wham, Colorado state legislator
 Robert Wham, lawyer and Colorado state legislator

References
49. https://www.ilga.gov/legislation/ilcs/ilcs4.asp?DocName=006500050HArt%2E+6&ActID=802&ChapterID=14&SeqStart=60100000&SeqEnd=64500000

External links

City of Centralia official website

 
Cities in Clinton County, Illinois
Cities in Jefferson County, Illinois
Cities in Washington County, Illinois
Cities in Marion County, Illinois
Cities in Illinois
Populated places established in 1853